The Voice Kids: Ahla Sawt is an Arabic TV series airing on MBC 1 and MBC 3. It premiered on 2 January 2016. The three judges for the inaugural season were Tamer Hosny, Nancy Ajram and Kadim Al Sahir. There are four stages starting with the Blind Auditions. Contestants between the ages of 7 and 14 sing covers of already existing songs without being seen by the judges. If a coach likes the contestant's performance, they turn their chair. Each coach is allowed to have 15 contestants on their team.

The season 1 finale was on 5 March 2016 and the winning contestant was Lynn Al-Hayek from Lebanon from Team Kathem Al-Saher. The season 2 finale was on 3 February 2018, and the winner was Hamza Lebyed from Morocco from Team Kathem Al-Saher. The season 3 finale was on 7 March 2020 and the winner was Mohamed Islam from Syria from Team Nancy Ajram. As of 2023, the broadcaster has yet to announce plans for a fourth season.

Coaches' timeline

Series overview
Color key
  Team Nancy 
  Team Tamer 
  Team Kadim
  Team Assi 
  Team Mohamed

Season summaries

External links
 

Arab world
Arabic television series
Singing competitions
Television shows remade overseas
Television series about children
Television series about teenagers